Radio Kraków is one of the regional stations of Polish Radio. It was created in 1927 as the second regional station of the Polish Radio, after Polish Radio Warsaw. It was one of the first radio stations to transmit a soccer match. It can be received in the Kraków Voivodeship and bordering entities.

External links
 Homepage

Mass media in Kraków
Polskie Radio
Radio stations established in 1927
1927 establishments in Poland